Sergey Morgunov ( may refer to:

 Sergey Morgunov (pilot) (1918-1946), Soviet flying ace
 Sergey Morgunov (athlete) (b. 1993), Russian track and field athlete